Paul Graetz (1901–1966) was a German-born French film producer. Based in Paris in the 1930s, he established own production company Transcontinental Films. He died while production of his final film Is Paris Burning? was underway.

Selected filmography
 The Phantom Wagon (1939)
 The Heart of a Nation (1943)
 Devil in the Flesh (1947)
 God Needs Men (1950)
 Rome 11:00 (1952)
 Knave of Hearts (1954)
 Men in White (1955)
 Bitter Victory (1957)
 From a Roman Balcony (1960)
 A View from the Bridge (1962)
 Girl's Apartment (1963)
 Is Paris Burning? (1966)

References

Bibliography
Johnson, William Bruce. Miracles & Sacrilege: Roberto Rossellini, the Church and Film Censorship in Hollywood. University of Toronto Press, 2008.

External links

1901 births
1966 deaths
German film producers
French film producers
Film people from Leipzig
German emigrants to France